José Pedro de Alcântara was the founder of Conceição de Ipanema town. Other founders are Manoel Francisco de Paula and Francisco Inácio Fernandes Leão. The main river of town received his name: José Pedro river.

People from Minas Gerais